The Eurovision Song Contest 2018  was the 63rd edition of the Eurovision Song Contest. Organised by the European Broadcasting Union (EBU) and host broadcaster Rádio e Televisão de Portugal (RTP), the contest was held at the Lisbon Arena, and consisted of two semi-finals on 8 and 10 May, and a final on 12 May 2018. The three live shows were presented by Portuguese television presenters Filomena Cautela, Sílvia Alberto and Catarina Furtado and Portuguese-American actress Daniela Ruah, marking the first time that the contest was presented by four hosts.

The winner was Israel with the song "Toy", performed by Netta and written by Doron Medalie and Stav Beger. Cyprus, Austria, Germany and Italy rounded out the top five, with Cyprus achieving their best result to date. Further down the table, the Czech Republic also achieved their best result to date, finishing sixth. Portugal finished in last place of the final, making it the third time that the host country ranked in the bottom five since . Also, for the first time since , no countries of the Caucasus region (and ) participated in the final.

The EBU reported that the contest had a worldwide audience of around 186 million viewers, surpassing the 2017 edition by over 4 million.

Location

Venue
The Lisbon Arena is a multi-purpose indoor arena built for the Expo '98 and has a capacity of 20,000 attendees, making it the largest indoor venue in Portugal and among the largest in Europe. It is located in the Parque das Nações (Park of Nations) riverside district in the northeast of Lisbon, which was completely renovated to host the 1998 world's fair. It is connected by metro to the nearby international airport and by train (Oriente Station) to the rest of the country and Europe.

Bidding phase

On the day of the Eurovision Song Contest 2017 final, it was reported that Portuguese broadcaster Rádio e Televisão de Portugal (RTP) would accept the challenge of organising the 2018 contest in case of a victory. Following Sobral's triumph, the European Broadcasting Union (EBU)'s Executive Supervisor for the Eurovision Song Contest, Jon Ola Sand, issued the hosting invitation to RTP during the winner's press conference. The following day, the director-general of RTP, Nuno Artur Silva, confirmed that the broadcaster would organise the contest in 2018 and mentioned the Lisbon Arena as a likely venue to host the contest. On 15 May 2017, RTP appeared to have confirmed Lisbon as the host city, but clarified the following day that no final decision had been taken regarding both the host city and venue.

The basic requirements to select a host city were set out in a document presented by the EBU to RTP following their win in Kyiv:
A suitable venue that can accommodate around 10,000 spectators.
An international press centre for 1,500 journalists with adequate facilities for all the delegates.
A good distribution of hotel rooms, at different price categories, able to accommodate at least 2,000 delegates, accredited journalists and spectators.
An efficient transport infrastructure, including a nearby international airport with readily available connections with the city, venue, and hotels.

Besides Lisbon, other cities signalled their interest in bidding to host the 2018 contest: Braga, Espinho, Faro, Gondomar, Guimarães, and Santa Maria da Feira. The mayor of Porto, Rui Moreira, declared he would not be interested in "spending millions of euros" to host the contest, but he would support a bid from the Metropolitan Area of Porto (Espinho, Gondomar, and Santa Maria da Feira).

On 13 June 2017, RTP representatives met with the Eurovision Song Contest Reference Group at the EBU headquarters in Geneva. During the meeting, RTP officials attended a workshop covering several topics related with hosting the Eurovision Song Contest and learned from the experience of the Ukrainian broadcaster UA:PBC. They also had the opportunity to present their first plans for the 2018 contest, including multiple proposals for the host city and venue.

On 25 July 2017, the EBU and RTP announced that Lisbon had been selected as the host city, overcoming confirmed bids from Braga, Gondomar, Guimarães, and Santa Maria da Feira. In addition, RTP indicated the Parque das Nações, where the Lisbon Arena is located, as the site for the shows.

Key:

 Host venue

Other sites

The Eurovision Village was the official Eurovision Song Contest fan and sponsors area during the event weeks, where it was possible to watch performances by contest participants and local artists, as well as the live shows broadcast from the main venue. It was located in Lisbon's downtown Praça do Comércio (also called Terreiro do Paço), a large central square open to the Tagus river.

The EuroClub was the venue for the official after-parties and private performances by contest participants. Unlike the Eurovision Village, access to the EuroClub was restricted to accredited fans, delegations, and press. It was located at the "Ministerium" club, next to the Eurovision Village.

The "Blue Carpet" event, where all the contestants and their delegations are presented before the accredited press and fans, took place on 6 May 2018 at the Museum of Art, Architecture and Technology (MAAT) in Lisbon's Belém district. This preceded the official Opening Ceremony of the 2018 contest, which took place at the nearby Electricity Museum.

Format

Visual design
The theme for the contest, "All Aboard!", was unveiled on 7 November 2017 in a press conference held at the Lisbon Oceanarium. Its visual design features oceanic motifs that allude to Lisbon and Portugal's location on the Atlantic coast and to the country's seafaring history. Alongside the main emblem, which depicts a stylised seashell, twelve supplemental emblems were designed to symbolise different aspects of the marine ecosystem.

Postcards
The postcards, filmed between March and April 2018, involved the act emerging from a door into Portugal to take part in a themed activity, such as mountain biking, making a salad or pastel de nata, or visiting popular attractions. The location where the activity took place was written in Portuguese at the start of the postcard. At the end of the postcard, the act posed for the camera, the slogan's hashtag appeared on the bottom corner of the screen, and song information was printed onto the country's flag. All the postcards had the same score, composed by Luis Figueredo.

 Aveiro
 Grândola
 Lisbon
 Monsanto
 Monsaraz
 Praça do Comércio, Lisbon
 Tagus River, Lisbon
 Lisbon
 
 
 Podence
 Mafra
 Sintra
 Albufeira
 Viana do Castelo
 Lisbon
 Calheta
 Ílhavo
 Óbidos
 Eduardo VII Park and Museu da Marioneta, Lisbon
 Porto Santo Island
 A rooftop bar, Lisbon
 Porto
 Benagil
 Caramulo
 Alter do Chão
 Vidago
 A flea market, Lisbon
 Lisbon
 Palace of the Marquises of Fronteira, Lisbon
 Lisbon
 Ericeira
 Tagus River
 Arouca
 Lisbon Oceanarium, Lisbon
 Funchal
 A winery, Porto
 Faial Island
 São Miguel Island
 Serra da Estrela
 Porto
 Vila Nova de Milfontes
 São Miguel Island

Presenters

RTP and EBU announced on 8 January 2018, that the contest would be hosted for the first time by four female presenters, consisting of RTP hosts Sílvia Alberto, Filomena Cautela, and Catarina Furtado, together with actress Daniela Ruah. It was the first time since  that the contest did not feature a male presenter, and the second consecutive year that the presenters were all the same gender. It was confirmed on 4 May 2018 that Cautela would also host the green room.

The Blue Carpet opening ceremony was hosted by actress , radio host , actor/TV host  and actor/director . Granger and Penim moderated the press conferences, as well.

Semi-final allocation draw
The draw to determine the allocation of the participating countries into their respective semi-finals took place on 29 January 2018 at 13:00 CET, at the Lisbon City Hall. The thirty-seven semi-finalists were divided over six pots, based on historical voting patterns as calculated by the contest's official televoting partner Digame. The purpose of drawing from different pots was to reduce the chance of "bloc voting" and to increase suspense in the semi-finals. The ceremony was hosted by contest presenters Sílvia Alberto and Filomena Cautela, and included the passing of the host city insignia from Vitali Klitschko, mayor of Kyiv (host city of the previous contest) to Fernando Medina, mayor of Lisbon.

Opening and interval acts
RTP released the first details regarding the opening and interval acts for the final on 12 March 2018. The opening act featured Portuguese fado singers Ana Moura and Mariza performing "Fado Loucura" and "Barco Negro", respectively, which was followed by a parade of flags introducing the 26 finalist participants, with live music by Portuguese scratching duo Beatbombers. The interval acts included Salvador Sobral, who performed his new single "Mano a mano" and his Eurovision-winning song "Amar pelos dois" (the latter in a duet with Brazilian singer Caetano Veloso), and electronic music performances by Branko featuring Sara Tavares, Mayra Andrade and Dino D'Santiago.

Participating countries

It was initially announced on 7 November 2017 that forty-two countries would participate in the contest.  confirmed their return after their absence the previous edition, while 's participation was provisionally blocked by the EBU due to unpaid debts by its national broadcaster MRT. However, ten days later, it was announced that Macedonia would be allowed to enter the contest, raising the number of participating countries to forty-three, equaling the highest number of participants with the 2008 and 2011 editions.

Returning artists

The contest featured two representatives who also previously performed as lead vocalists for the same countries.

The contest also featured Jessica Mauboy, representing Australia, after taking part in 2014 as the interval act for the second semi-final, performing "Sea of Flags". In addition, the contest featured four lead singers previously participating as backing vocalists, two of them for the same countries. Sara Tavares, who performed in the interval act, was the representative from Portugal in the 1994 Eurovision Song Contest, with the song "Chamar a música" reaching 8th place.

Semi-final 1
The first semi-final took place on 8 May 2018 at 20:00 WEST (21:00 CEST).
Nineteen countries participated in the first semi-final. The highlighted countries qualified for the final.

Semi-final 2
The second semi-final took place on 10 May 2018 at 20:00 WEST (21:00 CEST). Eighteen countries participated in the second semi-final. Those countries, plus ,  and  voted in this semi-final. The highlighted countries qualified for the final.

With the approval from the Reference Group, Italy broadcast and voted in the second semi-final following a request from Italian broadcaster RAI, as the date of the first semi-final coincided with the scheduled final of the fifth season of The Voice of Italy.

Final
The final took place on 12 May 2018 at 20:00 WEST (21:00 CEST). Twenty-six countries participated in the final, with all 43 participating countries eligible to vote. The running order for the final was revealed after the press conference of the second semi-final qualifiers on 10 May.

Detailed voting results

Semi-final 1

12 points 
Below is a summary of the maximum 12 points awarded by each country's professional jury and televote in the first semi-final. Countries in bold gave the maximum 24 points (12 points apiece from professional jury and televoting) to the specified entrant.

Semi-final 2

12 points 
Below is a summary of the maximum 12 points awarded by each country's professional jury and televote in the second semi-final. Countries in bold gave the maximum 24 points (12 points apiece from professional jury and televoting) to the specified entrant.

Final

12 points 
Below is a summary of the maximum 12 points awarded by each country's professional jury and televote in the final. Countries in bold gave the maximum 24 points (12 points apiece from professional jury and televoting) to the specified entrant.

Spokespersons
The spokespersons announced the 12-point score from their respective country's national jury in the following order:

 
 Tural Asadov
 Naviband
 John Kennedy O'Connor
 O'G3NE
 Jana Burčeska
 Lara Azzopardi
 Tamara Gachechiladze
 Nieves Álvarez
 Kati Bellowitsch
 Ulla Essendrop
 Mel Giedroyc
 Felix Sandman
 Dagmāra Legante
 Andri Xhahu
 Uršula Tolj
 Nicky Byrne
 Sonia Argint-Ionescu
 
 Edda Sif Pálsdóttir
 Djulieta Ardovan
 Danira Boukhriss
 Aleksander Walmann and Jowst
 Élodie Gossuin
 Giulia Valentina Palermo
 Ricardo Gonçalves
 
 
 Hovig
 Arsen Grigoryan
 
 Olina Xenopoulou
 
 Nataša Šotra
 Barbara Schöneberger
 Anna Abreu
 Alsou
 Letícia Carvalho
 Lucy Ayoub
 Mateusz Szymkowiak
 Eglė Daugėlaitė
 Maja Keuc

Other countries

Eligibility for participation in the Eurovision Song Contest requires a national broadcaster with active EBU membership, or a special invitation from the EBU as in the case of Australia.

Active EBU members
 – The Director General of Ràdio i Televisió d'Andorra (RTVA) announced on 14 May 2017 that Andorra would not participate in the contest, due to financial difficulties and the restructuring of the company.
 – Steve Schmit, the Director of Programming at the Luxembourgish broadcaster (RTL), explained last year the reasons against participating in the Eurovision Song Contest. He also underlined that Luxembourg's chance for success in the contest is limited: "I believe that (with) the enlargement of Eurovision, the days (of victory) are gone. With the new voting system, it is very unlikely that Luxembourg is successful. Small countries are somewhat more troubled now".
 – Eríka Rusnáková, press spokesperson of the Slovak broadcaster Radio and Television of Slovakia (RTVS), confirmed on 11 September 2017 to Czech Eurovision website Eurocontest.cz that the country would not participate in the 2018 contest.
 – On 12 July 2017, Sertab Erener, who won for Turkey in 2003, announced on an Instagram live chat that Turkey would return and wished luck to the next representative. maNga, the 2010 Turkish representatives, and Hadise, the 2009 Turkish representative, also expressed their interests for Turkey returning to the contest. Despite these statements, on 7 August 2017, the Deputy Prime Minister of Turkey, Bekir Bozdağ, issued a statement saying that there were no plans for a return. The same day, TRT confirmed their non-participation in the 2018 contest.

Associate EBU members
 – Khabar Agency became an associate member of the EBU on 1 January 2016, opening up the possibility of future participation. They broadcast all the shows in 2017. Furthermore, the winner of the Turkvision Song Contest 2014, Zhanar Dugalova, said she would be interested in representing Kazakhstan in the contest. However, on 25 September, Khabar Agency told Esctoday that: "We have no information about Kazakshtan’s participation in Eurovision 2018 yet", maintaining the possibility of the country being invited by the EBU, as it is entirely at the EBU's discretion to extend an invitation like in the case of Australia. The EBU however, chose not to invite Kazakhstan, as seen in the list of participants. On 22 December 2017, it was claimed that Channel 31 had finalised negotiations with the EBU, allowing Kazakhstan to debut in 2019, however, on 23 December 2017, the EBU told Esctoday that: "Channel 31 Kazakhstan has indeed expressed interest in becoming a Member of the EBU and hence participate in the Eurovision Song Contest. However, since Channel 31 is outside the European Broadcasting Area and is also not a member of the Council of Europe, it is not eligible to become an active Member of the EBU".

Non-EBU members
  – Kosovar media reported that RTK was hopeful that they would debut in the 2018 Eurovision Song Contest in Portugal. In an article published by RTK the Director of Television at the Kosovar broadcaster stated that he had received the support of national broadcasters across the Balkans to participate in the competition. However, both Bosnia-Herzegovina and Serbia had opposed such participation. The EBU then sent a letter to RTK explaining that Kosovo cannot participate in the ESC, because it is not a UN member and it is not a fully recognised state.
  – On 1 September 2017, 1 FL TV, the national broadcaster of the Principality of Liechtenstein confirmed that the country would not debut in 2018. However, on 4 November 2017, 1 FL TV announced that they are planning a debut in the Eurovision Song Contest in 2019.

Broadcasts 

The European Broadcasting Union provided international live streams of both semi-finals and the grand final through their official YouTube channel with no commentary. The live streams were geo-blocked to viewers in Bolivia, Canada, Costa Rica, Dominican Republic, Ecuador, El Salvador, Guatemala, Honduras, Nicaragua, Panama, Paraguay, United States, Uruguay and Venezuela due to rights limitations.

Countries may add commentary from commentators working on-location or remotely at the broadcaster. Commentators can add insight to the participating entries and the provision of voting information.

{| class="wikitable plainrowheaders"
|-
|+ Broadcasters and commentators in participating countries
|-
! scope="col" | Country
! scope="col" | 
! scope="col" | Broadcaster(s)
! scope="col" | Commentator(s)
! scope="col" | 
|-
! scope="row" | 
| All shows
| RTSH, RTSH Muzikë, Radio Tirana
| Andri Xhahu
| 
|-
! scope="row" | 
| All shows
| Armenia 1, Public Radio of Armenia
| Avet Barseghyan and 
| 
|-
! scope="row" | 
| All shows
| SBS
| Myf Warhurst and Joel Creasey
| 
|-
! scope="row" | 
| All shows
| ORF eins
| Andi Knoll
| 
|-
! scope="row" | 
| All shows
| İTV
| Azer Suleymanli
| 
|-
! scope="row" | 
| All shows
| Belarus-1, Belarus 24
| Evgeny Perlin
| 
|-
! scope="row" rowspan="2" | 
| All shows
| één
| Dutch: Peter Van de Veire
| 
|-
| All shows
| La Une
| French:  and Maureen Louys
| 
|-
! scope="row" | 
| All shows
| BNT 1
| Elena Rosberg and Georgi Kushvaliev
| 
|-
! scope="row" | 
| All shows
| HRT 1, HR 2
| Duško Ćurlić
| 
|-
! scope="row" | 
| All shows
| CyBC
| Costas Constantinou and Vaso Komninou
| 
|-
! scope="row" rowspan="2" | 
| Semi-finals
| ČT2
| rowspan="2" | 
| rowspan="2" | 
|-
| Final
| ČT1
|-
! scope="row" | 
| All shows
| DR1
| Ole Tøpholm
| 
|-
! scope="row" rowspan="3" | 
| rowspan="2" | All shows
| ETV
| Estonian: Marko Reikop
| 
|-
| ETV+
| Russian: Aleksandr Hobotov and Julia Kalenda
| 
|-
| SF1/Final
| Raadio 2
| Estonian: Mart Juur and Andrus Kivirähk 
| 
|-
! scope="row" rowspan="5" | 
| SF1/Final
| rowspan="2" | Yle TV2
| Finnish: Mikko Silvennoinen
| rowspan="5" | 
|-
| SF2
| Finnish: Mikko Silvennoinen and Saara Aalto
|-
| All shows
| Yle TV2 and Yle X3M
| Swedish:  and Johan Lindroos
|-
| Semi-finals
| rowspan="2" | Yle Radio Suomi
| Finnish: Anna Keränen
|-
| Final
| Finnish: Anna Keränen,  and 
|-
! scope="row" rowspan="2" | 
| Semi-finals
| France 4
| Christophe Willem and André Manoukian
| rowspan="2" | 
|-
| Final
| France 2
| Stéphane Bern, Christophe Willem and Alma
|-
! scope="row" | 
| All shows
| 1TV
| Demetre Ergemlidze
| 
|-
! scope="row" rowspan="2" | 
| All shows
| One
| rowspan="2" | Peter Urban
| rowspan="2" | 
|-
| Final
| Das Erste, Deutsche Welle
|-
! scope="row" rowspan="2" | 
| rowspan="2" | All shows
| ERT2, ERT HD
| Alexandros Lizardos and Daphne Skalioni
| 
|-
| Deftero Programma, Voice of Greece
| Dimitris Meidanis
| 
|-
! scope="row" | 
| All shows
| Duna
| Krisztina Rátonyi and Freddie
| 
|-
! scope="row" | 
| All shows
| RÚV
| Gísli Marteinn Baldursson
| 
|-
! scope="row" rowspan="4" | 
| Semi-finals
| RTÉ2
| rowspan="2" | Marty Whelan
| rowspan="2" | 
|-
| Final
| RTÉ One
|-
| SF2
| RTÉ Radio 1
| rowspan="2" | Neil Doherty and Zbyszek Zalinski
| rowspan="2" | 
|-
| Final
| RTÉ 2fm
|-
! scope="row" rowspan="3" | 
| SF1
| rowspan="3" | Kan 11, Kan 88
|  and 
| 
|-
| SF2
|  and 
| 
|-
| Final
| Erez Tal and Idit Hershkowitz
| 
|-
! scope="row" rowspan="3" | 
| Semi-finals
| Rai 4
| Carolina Di Domenico and 
| 
|-
| rowspan="2" | Final
| Rai 1
| Serena Rossi and Federico Russo
| rowspan="2" | 
|-
| Rai Radio 2
| Carolina Di Domenico and 
|-
! scope="row" rowspan="2" | 
| Semi-finals
| rowspan="2" | LTV
| 
| rowspan="2" | 
|-
| Final
| Toms Grēviņš and Magnuss Eriņš
|-
! scope="row" | 
| All shows
| LRT, LRT Radijas
|  and Gerūta Griniūtė
| 
|-
! scope="row" | 
| All shows
| MRT 1, MRT 2
| Karolina Petkovska
| 
|-
! scope="row" | 
|  
| TVM 
|  
|   
|-
! scope="row" | 
|  
| TRM 
|  
|   
|-
! scope="row" | 
| All shows
| TVCG 1, TVCG SAT
| Dražen Bauković and Tijana Mišković
| 
|-
! scope="row" | 
| All shows
| NPO 1
| Jan Smit and Cornald Maas
| 
|-
! scope="row" rowspan="3" | 
| All shows
| NRK1
| Olav Viksmo-Slettan
| 
|-
| rowspan="2" | Final
| NRK3
| ,  and 
| 
|-
| NRK P1
| Ole-Christian Øen
| 
|-
! scope="row" | 
| All shows
| TVP1, TVP Polonia
| Artur Orzech
| 
|-
! scope="row" rowspan="2" | 
| All shows
| RTP1, RTP África, RTP Internacional
|  and Nuno Galopim
| 
|-
| scope="row" | Final
| Antena 1, RDP África, RDP Internacional
| Noémia Gonçalves,  and 
| 
|-
! scope="row" | 
| All shows
| TVR 1, TVR HD, TVRi
| Liliana Ștefan and Radu Andrei Tudor
| 
|-
! scope="row" | 
| All shows
| Channel One
| Yana Churikova and 
| 
|-
! scope="row" | 
| All shows
| San Marino RTV, Radio San Marino
| Lia Fiorio and Gigi Restivo
| 
|-
! scope="row" rowspan="2" | 
| SF1
| rowspan="2" | RTS1, RTS HD, RTS SAT, RTS Planeta
| Silvana Grujić and Tamara Petković
| rowspan="2" | 
|-
| SF2/Final
| Duška Vučinić
|-
! scope="row" rowspan="2" | 
| Semi-finals
| TV SLO 2
| rowspan="2" | 
| rowspan="2" | 
|-
| Final
| TV SLO 1
|-
! scope="row" rowspan="2" | 
| Semi-finals
| La 2
| rowspan="2" | Tony Aguilar and Julia Varela
| rowspan="2" | 
|-
| Final
| La 1
|-
! scope="row" | 
| All shows
| SVT1
| Sanna Nielsen and Edward af Sillén
| 
|-
! scope="row" rowspan="6" | 
| Semi-finals
| SRF zwei
| rowspan="2" | German: Sven Epiney
| rowspan="2" |
|-
| Final
| SRF 1
|-
| SF2
| RTS Deux
| rowspan="2" | French: Jean-Marc Richard and Nicolas Tanner
| 
|-
| Final
| RTS Un
| 
|-
| Semi-finals
| RSI La 2
| rowspan="2" | Italian: 
| rowspan="2" | 
|-
| Final
| RSI La 1
|- 
! scope="row" rowspan="4" | 
| All shows
| STB
| Serhiy Prytula
| 
|-
| SF1
| rowspan="3" | UA:First
| Timur Miroshnychenko and Mariya Yaremchuk
| rowspan="3" | 
|-
| SF2
| Timur Miroshnychenko and Alyosha
|-
| Final
| Timur Miroshnychenko and Jamala
|-
! scope="row" rowspan="3" | 
| Semi-finals
| BBC Four
| Scott Mills and Rylan Clark-Neal
| rowspan="3" | 
|-
| rowspan="2" | Final
| BBC One
| Graham Norton
|-
| BBC Radio 2
| Ken Bruce
|}

Incidents
Accusations of cultural appropriation
Following eventual winner Netta Barzilai's performance of her song "Toy", critics of the song accused Barzilai of culturally appropriating Japanese culture, with several users taking to social media to call the performance "offensive". The accusations were made after she wore a kimono and buns, as well as Maneki-nekos being shown during the performance.

The topic was debated on British morning show Good Morning Britain on 14 May 2018 in response, with television presenters Trisha Goddard and Piers Morgan defending Barzilai by stating that she was simply implementing elements of Japanese culture due to her own appreciation of it. English journalist Rebecca Reid disagreed, arguing "It's not a beautiful, loving representation of real Japanese culture. It's a costume".

Belarusian song submission
On 10 January 2018, it had emerged on Russian social media site VK that Ukrainian singer Alekseev had performed a Russian-language version of his EuroFest entry "Forever" (as Navsegda) in May 2017 in Stavropol – before 1 September 2017, the submission deadline set by the EBU, potentially violating the rules of the contest. Six artists threatened to withdraw from the selection if it were allowed to compete, with Sofi Lapina actually doing so. Alekseev was ultimately allowed to compete by BTRC following a melodic revamp of the song, and went on to win the selection, thus earning the right to represent Belarus in the contest. However, on 23 February 2018, it was reported that the EBU had given Alekseev permission to perform his original English-language version of the song at the contest, and he would opt to sing that version of the song in May. A few weeks after that announcement, on 28 March 2018, Alekseev premiered a new version of his entry with a lighter intro and additional choir at the end of the track. He also confirmed that this version would be the one performed in Lisbon.

Czech rehearsal injuries
On 29 April 2018, during the first rehearsal of the Czech Republic's performance, singer Mikolas Josef reportedly sustained injuries to his back while rehearsing and was subsequently taken to hospital. The singer updated his fans on Instagram, stating "I can confirm that I got injured during the rehearsal and the situation got worse after several hours. I can't even walk now. Got back from the first hospital and I am now heading to another one". He stated that he would, however, "perform no matter what". Josef performed in the first semi-final on 8 May with a slightly altered performance, owing to his injuries, and ultimately finished sixth in the final, achieving the Czech Republic's best result to date.

China’s Mango TV censorship
During the Chinese broadcast of the first semi-final on Mango TV, the performances of Albania and Ireland were edited out of the show, along with their snippets in the recap of all 19 entries. Albania was skipped due to a ban on television performers displaying tattoos that took effect in January 2018, while Ireland was censored due to its representation of a homosexual couple on-stage. In addition, the LGBT flag and tattoos on other performers were also blurred out from the broadcast. As a result, the EBU terminated its partnership with Mango TV, citing that censorship "is not in line with the EBU's values of universality and inclusivity and its proud tradition of celebrating diversity through music," which led to a ban on televising the second semi-final and the grand final in the country. A spokesperson for the broadcaster's owner Hunan TV said they "weren't aware" of the edits made to the programme. Ireland's representative Ryan O'Shaughnessy told the BBC in an interview that "they haven't taken this lightly and I think it's a move in the right direction, so I'm happy about it."

United Kingdom stage invasion
The performance of SuRie, who represented the United Kingdom, in the final was disrupted by a man who rushed onto the stage and grabbed her microphone, reportedly shouting "For the Nazis of the UK media, we demand freedom! War is not peace." The man, later identified as 'Dr ACactivism', a political activist from London, climbed into a camera run to get access to the stage. SuRie was able to complete her performance, and after the song the broadcast cut to an unscheduled interview in the green room. The EBU offered SuRie and her team the opportunity to perform again, but she declined. SuRie later revealed that she had suffered several bruises on her right hand. Shortly after the live broadcast on YouTube, the final was taken down and reuploaded in its entirety, with SuRie's interrupted performance edited out and substituted with her jury show performance from the previous evening. The official reupload also retains the unscheduled green room interview with the Ukrainian delegation that followed the stage invasion. The official DVD release also replaces the interrupted grand final performance with the previous evening's jury show performance. However, the British national broadcaster BBC uploaded the original Saturday performance, including the stage invasion, to their YouTube channel.

Other awards
In addition to the main winner's trophy, the Marcel Bezençon Awards and the Barbara Dex Award were contested during the 2018 Eurovision Song Contest. The OGAE, "General Organisation of Eurovision Fans" voting poll also took place before the contest.

Marcel Bezençon Awards
The Marcel Bezençon Awards, organised since 2002 by Sweden's then-Head of Delegation and 1992 representative Christer Björkman, and 1984 winner Richard Herrey, honours songs in the contest's final. The awards are divided into three categories: Artistic Award, Composers Award, and Press Award. The winners were revealed shortly before the Eurovision final on 12 May.

OGAE
OGAE, an organisation of over forty Eurovision Song Contest fan clubs across Europe and beyond, conducts an annual voting poll first held in 2002 as the Marcel Bezençon Fan Award. After all votes were cast, the top-ranked entry in the 2018 poll was also the winner of the contest, "Toy" performed by Netta; the top five results are shown below.

Barbara Dex Award
The Barbara Dex Award is a humorous fan award given to the worst dressed artist each year. Named after Belgium's representative who came last in the 1993 contest, wearing her self-designed dress, the award was handed by the fansite House of Eurovision from 1997 to 2016 and is being carried out by the fansite Songfestival.be since 2017.

Official albumEurovision Song Contest: Lisbon 2018'' is the official compilation album of the contest, put together by the European Broadcasting Union and released by Universal Music Group digitally on 6 April 2018 and physically on 20 April 2018. The album features all 43 participating entries, including the semi-finalists that failed to qualify for the grand final.

Charts

See also
Eurovision Young Musicians 2018
Junior Eurovision Song Contest 2018

Notes

References

External links

 
2018
Music festivals in Portugal
2018 in Portugal
2018 song contests
May 2018 events in Portugal
Events in Lisbon
Music in Lisbon
Censorship of broadcasting
Obscenity controversies in music
Television controversies